Megacina is a genus of armoured harvestmen in the family Phalangodidae. There are at least four described species in Megacina.

Species
These four species belong to the genus Megacina:
 Megacina cockerelli (C.J. Goodnight & M.L. Goodnight, 1942)
 Megacina madera (Briggs, 1968)
 Megacina mayacma Ubick & Briggs, 2008
 Megacina schusteri Ubick & Briggs, 2008

References

Further reading

 
 
 
 

Harvestmen
Articles created by Qbugbot